Hospitals and health centres in Manitoba are under the purview of the provincial government's Department of Health and Seniors Care. Most direct health services in Manitoba are delivered through regional health authorities.

Interlake-Eastern Manitoba

Northern Manitoba 

* Despite being located in Northern Manitoba, Churchill Health Centre is overseen by the Winnipeg Regional Health Authority.

Southern Manitoba

Western Manitoba

Winnipeg 

Hospitals and health centres in the Winnipeg area:
Breast Health Centre
CancerCare Manitoba
The Children's Hospital of Winnipeg
Concordia Hospital
Deer Lodge Centre
Grace General Hospital
Health Sciences Centre (HSC)
Winnipeg General Hospital
Winnipeg Rehab Respiratory Hospital
Women’s Hospital
Misericordia Health Centre
Riverview Health Centre
Saint Boniface General Hospital
Seven Oaks General Hospital
Kildonan Medical Centre
Victoria General Hospital
Western Surgery Centre

See also 

 Manitoba Health
 University of Manitoba College of Medicine
 COVID-19 pandemic in Manitoba
 List of hospitals in Canada
 Healthcare in Canada

References

External links 

 Interlake-Eastern Regional Health Authority
 Northern Health Region
 Prairie Mountain Health (Western Manitoba)
 Southern Health-Santé Sud
 Winnipeg Regional Health Authority

Manitoba
Hospitals